South City International School is a private English-medium co-educational school located in south Kolkata, West Bengal, India. The school is affiliated to International General Certificate of Secondary Education and the Council for Indian School Certificate Examinations, New Delhi.

The school has A-Grade a/c busses to carry students to and from school. All classrooms are air conditioned, fitted with smart learning/audio and visual learning equipment and have lockers for students.

Sports 
The school has a lush and green multi-purpose field, an activity room and other spaces for sport facilities. The school lays emphasis on sports and has the facilities for the following Sports:
 Cricket
 Football
 Basketball
 Roller Skating
 Table Tennis
 Badminton 
 Karate
 Yoga
 Dance

School Clubs 
The school has many clubs which instills the want to be active in Extra Curricular activities in students. Following are the Clubs:
 English Drama Club
 Hindi Drama Club
 Art Club
 Eastern Music
 Western Music
 Just Dance Club
 Picture Perfect
 Grooming Club
 Quiz Club
 Heritage Club
 Interact Club
 IT Club
 Chemistry Club
 Nature Club
 Debate Club
 Tabla Club
 MUN Club

See also
Education in India
List of schools in India
Education in West Bengal

References

External links 
 

High schools and secondary schools in Kolkata
International schools in Kolkata
2009 establishments in West Bengal
Educational institutions established in 2009